Andrey Vladimirovich Grechin (born 21 October 1987) is a Russian swimmer. He competed in the 50 m, 100 m and 4 × 100 m freestyle and 4 × 100 m medley events at the 2008 and 2012 Olympics and won a bronze medal in the 4 × 100 m freestyle relay in 2012. He won three more medals in this event at the world championships in 2009–2015.

References

External links

1987 births
Living people
Russian male swimmers
Olympic swimmers of Russia
Swimmers at the 2008 Summer Olympics
Swimmers at the 2012 Summer Olympics
Swimmers at the 2016 Summer Olympics
Russian male freestyle swimmers
World Aquatics Championships medalists in swimming
Olympic bronze medalists for Russia
Olympic bronze medalists in swimming
European Aquatics Championships medalists in swimming
Medalists at the 2012 Summer Olympics
Universiade medalists in swimming
Universiade gold medalists for Russia
Universiade silver medalists for Russia
Universiade bronze medalists for Russia
Medalists at the 2007 Summer Universiade
Medalists at the 2013 Summer Universiade
Sportspeople from Barnaul